Son Suh-hyun (Hangul: , born September 7, 1999) is a South Korean figure skater. She has competed in the free skate at two ISU Championships – the 2016 World Junior Championships in Debrecen, Hungary, and the 2017 Four Continents Championships in Gangneung, South Korea.

Programs

Competitive highlights 
GP: Grand Prix; CS: Challenger Series; JGP: Junior Grand Prix

Detailed results

 Personal bests highlighted in bold.

References

External links 
 

1999 births
South Korean female single skaters
Living people
Figure skaters from Seoul